Star trap may refer to:

Star trap (trapdoor), a trapdoor used in theatres
Star Trap, a 1988 UK television film